Everybody Rides the Carousel is a 1975 independent animated film about the stages of life. It was directed by John Hubley and written and produced by Hubley and his wife Faith. Among the cast are Meryl Streep, Dinah Manoff, and Lane Smith and other members of the Hubley Family. The film was broadcast on television by CBS on September 10, 1976. Cicely Tyson hosts the special.

Cast

Prologue
Alvin Epstein

Stage 1
Judith Coburn
Ray Hubley
Lou Jacobi
Lane Smith
Eleanor Wilson

Stage 2
Georgia Hubley
Linda Washburn
Maura Washburn
Michael Washburn

Stage 3
Emily Hubley
Bruce E. Smith
Jane E. Smith

Stage 4
Leeds Atkinson
Jenny Lumet

Stage 5
Jo-Carroll Dennison

Stage 6
Charles Levin
Meryl Streep

Stage 7
Per Bloland
Dee Dee Bridgewater
Tulani Bridgewater
Pablo Casals
Dinah Manoff
Florence Miller
George Miller
Lawrence Pressman
John Randolph
Lanna Saunders
William Watts

Stage 8
Harry Edison
Jack Gilford
Jane Hoffman
Juanita Moore

See also
 List of American films of 1975

References

External links
 

1975 films
1975 animated films
Films directed by John Hubley
American independent films
1970s American animated films
1970s English-language films